Prochoristis rupicapralis is a moth in the family Crambidae. It is found in Lebanon, Syria, Turkmenistan and the United Arab Emirates.

References

Cybalomiinae
Moths described in 1855